The Oconee County Courthouse is a historic government building at 211 West Main Street in Walhalla, South Carolina.  Built in 1956, it served as a county courthouse until 2003, when the present courthouse was opened next door.  It was designed by the regional firm Lyles, Bissett, Carlisle & Wolff, known for its high quality Mid-Century Modern designs.  This building is a fine local example of Starved Classicism, a style not found in other courthouses in South Carolina's hill counties.

The building was listed on the National Register of Historic Places in 2016, at which time it stood vacant.

See also
National Register of Historic Places listings in Oconee County, South Carolina

References

Courthouses on the National Register of Historic Places in South Carolina
Buildings and structures in Oconee County, South Carolina
National Register of Historic Places in Oconee County, South Carolina